Arike (So Close) is a 2012 Malayalam romantic comedy film by Shyamaprasad, starring Dileep, Samvrutha Sunil and Mamta Mohandas. The film, based on a Bengali short story by Sunil Gangopadhyay, was produced under the banner of  Picture Perfect and has a script by Shyamaprasad, cinematography by Alagappan, editing by Vinod Sukumaran and music by Ouseppachan.

The film, a romantic comedy, is about the shades of love that vary in a relationship woven around three individuals.

Plot
The film tells the story of Shanthanu, a researcher in linguistics, and his two friends, Kalpana and Anuradha. Anuradha is the sensitive type who has gone through certain bitter experiences in her teenage years, when her cousin Balu approached her with love, which she later realised was just his lust for her. Kalpana is slightly capricious and loves being in love. Anuradha wants to play Cupid and bring Shanthanu and Kalpana together; she knows that they care a lot for each other, but for some reason or other are hesitant to take the next step.

Kalpana's parents are against her marrying Shanthanu and they try to bring proposals from their own Brahmin) community. At one point Kalpana's aunt tricks her into meeting a guy, Sanjay, whom they hope Kalpana will like and marry. While they travel with Sanjay in his car, they meet with an accident, which causes some scars on Kalpana's face and gave her a disfigured toe. After the accident Kalpana backs out from the relationship with Shanthanu and gives in to her parents' wishes to marry Sanjay. Anuradha feels very bad for Shanthanu and tries to console him. It is then that Shanthanu realizes that Kalpana had actually not loved him at all. Though his actual love was near him, so close, he failed to recognise it (Where the name of this film gets significance).

Cast

Production

Adaptation
Shyamaprasad has adapted several classics on celluloid so far. Arike is the latest in that list and is based on a Bengali short story by Sunil Gangopadhyay, whose novel was also the base for the director's Ore Kadal. Says the director, "I don’t think adapting stories from other languages is an issue at all, because human emotions are universal and can be told without linguistic barriers. I am fond of adapting literature, since writing a story is not my forte and I do not believe in concocting a story for the sake of filmmaking." He also adds that Basu Chatterjee, a Bollywood director who portrayed the middle-class in many films, proved to be his guiding force while making Arike.

Themes
Like all of Shyamaprasad's previous films, Arike too is about the quest for love. Talking about the theme of Arike, the director says, "There is an obsessive quest for love in each one of us. We have illusions and inhibitions about love, yet we have an irrepressible thirst for it. We all want to find happiness in love. But whether we get that happiness is the question which I want to delve through this film."

Compared to the dark themes he took up earlier, Arike'''s tone is relatively lighter. Shyamaprasad says, "In Ore Kadal, the subject had an shadow of gloom and depression, Ritu was about the aspirations and attitude of the young working population. Arike  has a breezy feel, and the story is told in a lighthearted and realistic way. I have also taken efforts to avoid cliches such as rain, sea, train that are common motifs in romantic films."

Casting and filming
The film has only a handful of characters. Shyamaprasad wanted to use live sound recording and hence he chose actors who could emote dialogues perfectly while shooting itself. Shyamaprasad says he selected Dileep to play the protagonist because he feels the actor has the look and feel of the character. This is the first time Shyamaprasad has cast Dileep in a lead role, though the actor had earlier done a role in the director's 1998 film Kallu Kondoru Pennu. The film's production started in late November 2011. The director had given all the actors a copy of the script so that they could practice their parts well.

The film uses sync sound recording or live sound recording. Shyamaprasad brought in Sohel Sanwari from Bollywood to record the sound. Says Shyamaprasad, "This is something I’ve always wanted to do. The early talkies had speech recorded live but the change to outdoor locations made carrying recording cameras cumbersome. Added to this was the fact that technicians and stars started travelling and this started the trend of dubbing. I feel that we lose 50 to 60 per cent of the performance when we post-synchronise voices. Take for example a scene on the seashore — our body, voice modulation and mannerisms are in sync with the surroundings. Dubbing in a studio means that a lot of vocal nuances get lost!" Lead player Dileep describes the sync sound recording experience, "I had to memorise the entire dialogues beforehand and deliver them at one go after umpteen rehearsals. It was a very novel experience for me and I personally feel that it increases one’s memory power." Samvrutha Sunil says, "This is my first film where our voices have been recorded live during our respective performances. The sync sound recording actually threw open many challenges - one, you can't console yourself for a not-up-to-the-mark performance saying that you can cover it up with a good dubbing and two, you have to byheart the dialogues thoroughly as there is no prompting."

The film was shot completely from Kozhikode. It was Shyamaprasad's first film to be filmed from the city. He says it was his emotional relationship with the city and its calm nature which helped live recording to a great extent, that inspired him to choose Kozhikode as the main locale. Filming was completed in late December 2011. Cinematographer Alagappan says he experimented a lot with the film, and the film was made in a special "visual tone." The film was shot using a Sony F3 Camera. Sakhi Thomas, who worked with Shyamaprasad in Ritu and Elektra'', was the costume designer for this film.

Soundtrack

Awards and nominations
Filmfare Awards South
Nominated-Filmfare Award for Best Actress - Malayalam-Mamta Mohandas
Asianet Film Awards
Asianet Most Popular Actress Award - Mamta Mohandas

References

External links

Reviews
 The Times of India
 IBN Live
 Rediff.com
 Nowrunning.com
 Sify.com (Verdict: Average)
 Prathidhwani.org (Verdict: Above Average)

2012 films
2010s Malayalam-language films
Films directed by Shyamaprasad
Films based on short fiction
Indian romantic comedy films
Films scored by Ouseppachan
2012 romantic comedy films
Films shot in Kozhikode
Films based on works by Sunil Gangopadhyay